Wade Van Valkenburg (January 16, 1899November 20, 1985) was a Republican politician from Michigan who served as the Speaker of the Michigan House of Representatives and as a local judge.

Born in Tipton on January 16, 1899, Van Valkenburg graduated from the University of Michigan and from the then-Detroit College of Law. He served in the United States Marine Corps during World War I.

After losing in the primary election in 1944, Van Valkenburg was elected to represent the 1st Kalamazoo district in the State House in 1946 and served until 1956. He was elected Speaker of the House for his final four years.

Nine years after leaving the House, Van Valkenburg became a circuit judge for Michigan's 9th Circuit, which consists of Kalamazoo County, where he served for three years. He was a member of the Freemasons, the Shriners, Kiwanis, and the American Legion.

Van Valkenburg died on November 20, 1985 in Kalamazoo.

In 2004, the Wade Van Valkenburg Trust established a scholarship program for students in Kalamazoo County who have been found guilty of a criminal offense and who can demonstrate how they have overcome adversity in their life.

References

1899 births
1985 deaths
Speakers of the Michigan House of Representatives
Republican Party members of the Michigan House of Representatives
People from Lenawee County, Michigan
Politicians from Kalamazoo, Michigan
University of Michigan alumni
Detroit College of Law alumni
United States Marine Corps personnel of World War I
20th-century American politicians
20th-century American judges